Gaby Casanova is a Swiss curler and World Champion. She was skip for the winning team at the 1979 World Curling Championships.

Teammates

References

Living people
Swiss female curlers
World curling champions
Year of birth missing (living people)
European curling champions
20th-century Swiss women